Śnieżnik Landscape Park (Śnieżnicki Park Krajobrazowy) is a protected area (Landscape Park) in south-western Poland, established in 1981, and covering an area of . It is located in the Śnieżnik Massif and the Golden Mountains, two shorter mountain ranges in the Eastern Sudetes, along the border with the Czech Republic. It is part of the  transboundary biosphere reserve, mixed mountain and highland system, bearing UNESCO designation. 

The Landscape Park takes its name from the highest peak in the range, which forms a triangle with (similarly sounding) Śnieżka, as well as Ślęża peaks, further apart, connected by a red hiking trail only for qualified tourists.

Location
The Śnieżnik Landscape Park lies within Lower Silesian Voivodeship: in Kłodzko County (Gmina Bystrzyca Kłodzka, Gmina Kłodzko, Gmina Lądek-Zdrój, Gmina Międzylesie, Gmina Stronie Śląskie) and Ząbkowice Śląskie County (Gmina Złoty Stok).

Within the Landscape Park are five nature reserves.

Notes and references

Landscape parks in Poland
Parks in Lower Silesian Voivodeship